The Thailand women's national handball team is the national handball team of Thailand and takes part in international team handball competitions.

The team participated in the 2009 World Women's Handball Championship in China, finishing 21st.

At the 2010 Asian Women's Handball Championship they finished in 7th place.

Results

World Championship
 2009 – 21st

Asian Championship
 2008 – 4th
 2010 – 7th
 2022 – 7th

External links
IHF profile

Women's national handball teams
handball
National team